Radek Štěpánek was the defending champion, but opted to play at the London Summer Olympics instead.
Alexandr Dolgopolov defeated Tommy Haas in three sets for the title, 6–7(7–9), 6–4, 6–1.

Seeds

Draw

Finals

Top half

Bottom half

Qualifying

Seeds

Qualifiers

Draw

First qualifier

Second qualifier

Third qualifier

Fourth qualifier

References
General

Specific

Citi Open - Men's Singles